In mathematics, an alternating series is an infinite series of the form
 or 
The signs of the general terms alternate between positive and negative. Like any series, an alternating series converges if and only if the associated sequence of partial sums converges.

Examples
The geometric series 1/2 − 1/4 %2B 1/8 − 1/16 %2B %E2%8B%AF sums to 1/3.

The alternating harmonic series has a finite sum but the harmonic series does not.

The Mercator series provides an analytic expression of the natural logarithm:

The functions sine and cosine used in trigonometry can be defined as alternating series in calculus even though they are introduced in elementary algebra as the ratio of sides of a right triangle. In fact,
 and

When the alternating factor  is removed from these series one obtains the hyperbolic functions sinh and cosh used in calculus.

For integer or positive index α the Bessel function of the first kind may be defined with the alternating series
 where  is the gamma function.

If  is a complex number, the Dirichlet eta function is formed as an alternating series

that is used in analytic number theory.

Alternating series test 

The theorem known as "Leibniz Test" or the alternating series test tells us that an alternating series will converge if the terms  converge to 0 monotonically.

Proof: Suppose the sequence  converges to zero and is monotone decreasing.

Since  is monotonically decreasing, the terms  are negative. Thus, we have the final inequality: . Similarly, it can be shown that . The argument for  even is similar.

Approximating sums 
So, if  is approaching 0 monotonically, the estimate provides an error bound for approximating infinite sums by partial sums:
That does not mean that this estimate always finds the very first element after which error is less than the modulus of the next term in the series. Indeed if you take  and try to find the term after which error is at most 0.00005, the inequality above shows that the partial sum up through  is enough, but in fact this is twice as many terms as needed. Indeed, the error after summing first 9999 elements is 0.0000500025, and so taking the partial sum up through  is sufficient. This series happens to have the property that constructing a new series with  also gives an alternating series where the Leibniz test applies and thus makes this simple error bound not optimal. This was improved by the Calabrese bound, discovered in 1962, that says that this property allows for a result 2 times less than with the Leibniz error bound. In fact this is also not optimal for series where this property applies 2 or more times, which is described by Johnsonbaugh error bound. If one can apply the property an infinite number of times, Euler's transform applies.

Absolute convergence 
A series  converges absolutely if the series  converges.

Theorem: Absolutely convergent series are convergent.

Proof: Suppose  is absolutely convergent. Then,  is convergent and it follows that  converges as well. Since , the series  converges by the comparison test. Therefore, the series  converges as the difference of two convergent series .

Conditional convergence 
A series is conditionally convergent if it converges but does not converge absolutely.

For example, the harmonic series

diverges, while the alternating version

converges by the alternating series test.

Rearrangements 
For any series, we can create a new series by rearranging the order of summation. A series is unconditionally convergent if any rearrangement creates a series with the same convergence as the original series. Absolutely convergent series are unconditionally convergent. But the Riemann series theorem states that conditionally convergent series can be rearranged to create arbitrary convergence. The general principle is that addition of infinite sums is only commutative for absolutely convergent series.

For example, one false proof that 1=0 exploits the failure of associativity for infinite sums.

As another example, by Mercator series

But, since the series does not converge absolutely, we can rearrange the terms to obtain a series for :

Series acceleration 
In practice, the numerical summation of an alternating series may be sped up using any one of a variety of series acceleration techniques. One of the oldest techniques is that of Euler summation, and there are many modern techniques that can offer even more rapid convergence.

See also
 Grandi's series
 Nörlund–Rice integral

Notes

References
 Earl D. Rainville (1967) Infinite Series, pp 73–6, Macmillan Publishers.

Mathematical series
Real analysis